"Red Nose" is a song by American rapper Sage the Gemini from his debut album Remember Me. The song was released as his debut single on March 19, 2013. It was a minor hit on the Billboard Hot 100, peaking at number 52 but fared better on the Hot R&B/Hip-Hop Songs and Hot Rap Songs charts at numbers 14 and 10, respectively.

Music video
A music video for the song was released on June 10, 2013. As of April 2020, it has over 130 million views on YouTube.

Commercial performance
"Red Nose" debuted at number 62 on US Billboard Hot 100 for the week of August 3, 2013. Eight weeks later, the song peaked at number 52 for the week of September 28, 2013 and spent a total of twenty weeks on the chart. As of June 1, 2014, the song has sold 639,046 digital copies in the United States, according to Nielsen SoundScan.

Chart performance

Weekly charts

Year-end charts

Certifications

References

2013 debut singles
2013 songs
Sage the Gemini songs
Republic Records singles
Songs written by Sage the Gemini